Rumley is an unincorporated community in Shelby County, in the U.S. state of Ohio.

History
Rumley was founded in 1837. A post office called Rumley was established in 1839, and remained in operation until 1842.

References

Online Links
Barnett Cemetery Find a grave
Redman Cemetery Find a grave

Unincorporated communities in Shelby County, Ohio
Unincorporated communities in Ohio